The Big Springs Conference is a high school athletic conference comprising small-size high schools located in southeast Missouri. The conference members are located in the counties of Carter, Oregon, Reynolds, Shannon, and Texas.

Members
The Big Spring Conference consists of eight high schools.  The conference comprises both Class 1 and Class 2 schools (in boys' basketball), the two smallest classes in Missouri.

References

Missouri high school athletic conferences
High school sports conferences and leagues in the United States